Kira Holmes is an Australian cricketer who currently plays for Queensland in the Women's National Cricket League (WNCL). She plays as a right-handed batter.

Domestic cricket
Holmes plays grade cricket for Valley District Cricket Club. Before concentrating on cricket, Holmes was a competitive campdrafter and equestrian competitor.

In January 2019, Holmes played for Northern Territory Under-18s at the National Underage Championships, being part of the team's north Queensland cohort. Holmes was first selected in a squad for Queensland in December 2022, but made her debut for the side in January 2023, against Victoria in the Women's National Cricket League.

References

External links

Living people
Date of birth missing (living people)
Year of birth missing (living people)
Place of birth missing (living people)
Australian women cricketers
Queensland Fire cricketers